Stargate: SG-1 Roleplaying Game is a role-playing game based on the TV series Stargate SG-1, released in 2003 by Alderac Entertainment Group. The game, based on AEG's Spycraft, uses the d20 System. Since Sony did not renew AEG's contract to publish the game, it is now out of print.

History
The Stargate SG:1 RPG (2003) followed Alderac Entertainment Group's publication of the Spycraft d20 espionage game, and was entirely compatible with first edition Spycraft. Stargate SG:1 started receiving season guides and other supplements but MGM decided to pull AEG's license; thus, the RPG only covered the first two seasons of the show.

Core rulebook 
The core Stargate SG-1 role-playing book is a hardbound and full-color 488 page volume. The content includes:
 summaries of the television show's first six seasons
 information on some worlds previously visited by SG-1
 information regarding Stargate Command and the Cheyenne Mountain Complex
 details on the Goa'uld, including their history, breeding information, types, and common psychology
 skills, feats, and gear for character ability development
 details for Game Masters on building worlds to visit, races to encounter, and otherwise constructing adventures in the Stargate setting

Supplements 
AEG have published several supplemental books for the Stargate role-playing line:
Fantastic Frontiers (2003) and Friends and Foes (2004), detailing seasons one and two of the series
Living Gods (2004), giving details of the Goa'uld System Lords
First Steps (2004), a collection of worlds and adventures. These are created by AEG and not taken from the series.

Reviews
Pyramid

References

External links
Stargate SG-1 home page at Alderac Entertainment Group

Alderac Entertainment Group games
D20 System
Military role-playing games
Role-playing games based on television series
Role-playing games introduced in 2003
Science fiction role-playing games
Stargate